Alexandru Golban (born 28 February 1979 in Chișinău, Moldavian SSR, Soviet Union) is a retired footballer and also former member of Moldova national team.

He holds dual Moldovan-Romanian nationality.

Career

Club career
At club level, he was known in 2001–02 season where he received his first national call-up. In February 2004, he leave Moldova to Ukrainian side Karpaty Lviv, signed a three-year contract. He played for the club in two First League season, and two Premier League half-season, where he just played 4 times in Ukrainian Premier League. After receiving the Romanian nationality, he moved to German 2. Bundesliga side Eintracht Braunschweig. After the club relegated to the Regionalliga in summer 2007, he moved to Romanian side Ceahlăul Piatra Neamţ and in mid-season to Kazakhstani side FC Tobol.

International career
Golban has made 15 appearances for Moldova, and he played in UEFA Euro 2004 qualifying and 2006 FIFA World Cup qualifying.

Career statistics

International goals

References

External links

Profile at FFU website

1979 births
Romanian people of Moldovan descent
Living people
Moldovan footballers
Moldova international footballers
FC Dacia Chișinău players
Eintracht Braunschweig players
FC Karpaty Lviv players
FC Tobol players
Simurq PIK players
CSM Ceahlăul Piatra Neamț players
Association football forwards
Moldovan Super Liga players
Liga I players
2. Bundesliga players
Ukrainian Premier League players
Kazakhstan Premier League players
Moldovan expatriate footballers
Expatriate footballers in Ukraine
Moldovan expatriate sportspeople in Ukraine
Expatriate footballers in Germany
Moldovan expatriate sportspeople in Germany
Expatriate footballers in Romania
Moldovan expatriate sportspeople in Romania
Expatriate footballers in Kazakhstan
Moldovan expatriate sportspeople in Kazakhstan
Expatriate footballers in Azerbaijan
Moldovan expatriate sportspeople in Azerbaijan
Footballers from Chișinău
Speranța Nisporeni players
FC Veris Chișinău players
FC Speranța Crihana Veche players